The San Cristobal mine in Lipez, Potosí Department, Bolivia is an open-pit silver, lead and zinc mine near the town of San Cristóbal, Potosí. The mine, operated by Sumitomo Corporation, produces approximately 1,300 metric tons of zinc-silver concentrate and 300 tons of lead-silver concentrate per day, by processing 40,000 to 50,000 tons of rock. It is one of Bolivia's largest mining facilities and, according to Sumitomo, the world's sixth-largest producer of zinc and third-largest producer of silver. It is located in southwestern Bolivia and hosts approximately 450 million ounces of silver and 8 billion pounds of zinc and 3 billion pounds of lead contained in 231 million tonnes of open-pittable proven and probable reserves. As the ore body is open both at depth and laterally, reserve expansion potential is considered excellent. The mine has been in various stages of development since the early 1980s but only recently came into full operation.

Geology

Silver was discovered in what would become the Hedionda mine, during the 17th century, by A.A. Barba, a Spanish priest.  Carbon dioxide poisoning limited the exploitation of the silver though.  Compania Minera de San Cristobal operated the Toldos mine from 1870 to 1921.  The Polish engineer J. Jackowski operated the Hedionda mine from 1896 to 1901, and from 1927 to 1936, using a groove in the floor to channel carbon dioxide out of the mine.  P. Zubrzycki operated the mine from 1963, before transferring rights to the Lipez Mining Co. in 1966.  The Cooperativa Minera Litoral started operating the Animas mine in 1965.

The geologic history from Tertiary and Quaternary periods includes 1) deposition and folding of the Potoco Formation, 2) erosion of this formation, 3) deposition of the Quehua Formation, 4) intrusion of the andesite porphyry stocks, 5) hydrothermal circulation altering rocks and depositing oxide-siderite-barite veins containing silver, 6) intrusion of dacite porphyry stocks, uplift of the Potoco and Quehua Formations, and deposition of dacite porphyry lava flows, 7) intrusion of breccia pipes and faulting, 8) deposition of dacite tuff, 9) hydrothermal circulation altering rocks and depositing galena, sphalerite, pyrite, native silver and barite, 10) erosion.

Ownership
The San Cristóbal mine was formerly developed by Apex Silver Mines Ltd. of Denver, Colorado, a company founded in 1993. In September 2006, Sumitomo Corporation of Japan acquired a 35% share of the facility in a financing deal. The acquisition was supported by the Japan Bank for International Cooperation and Nippon Export and Investment Insurance (NEXI). Sumitomo Corporation assumed full ownership following Apex Silver's 2009 bankruptcy filing.

Labor conditions
A miner works 12-hour shifts from 7 in the morning to 7 at night. Locals alternate working for two weeks with one week of leave. Most of the workers are from local towns in the AltiPlano including San Cristobal, and Culpina K.

Controversy
The San Cristobal mine faces some controversy with the Bolivian government due to Bolivian President Evo Morales's desire to nationalize, at least in all but name, the mining industry in Bolivia. Previously the oil and natural gas industry was nationalized and Bolivian troops seized the fields; initially the nationalization took shape in the form of increased taxes for profits in this industry - from 50% to 83%. There has been great fear that next would be the mining industry.

However, on May 1, 2007, President Morales signed Presidential Decree 29117 that assured all mining concessions existing at the time of the Decree will be respected and will remain in effect. This is the most significant step since the May 10, 2006 ruling by the Bolivian Supreme Court which declared the Mining Code to be unconstitutional. The court's ruling is not effective until May 2008 and the court urged the Bolivian Congress to enact legislation during that time which may supersede the ruling.

Under the Mining Code, all mineral deposits in Bolivia are the property of the State. Mining concessions awarded by the State grant the holder, subject to certain payments, the exclusive right to carry out prospecting, exploration, exploitation, concentration, smelting, refining and marketing activities with respect to all mineral substances located within a given concession. Under Bolivian law, local and foreign companies are treated equally in obtaining mineral concessions.

The court determined that the natural resources of Bolivia are owned by the public and the public must maintain ownership in part of these resources regardless of concessions made to foreign entities wishing to develop these resources. It ruled the State does not have the proper authority to give the aforementioned concessions to private companies wishing to engage in the mining of natural resources. In essence that is to say that a foreign company cannot own in full a mining operation in Bolivia without the State owning a part of it.

The mining Decree by the President also designated all unclaimed mineral resources within the national territory as a Mining Fiscal Reserve to be administered by Bolivia's national mining company, COMIBOL. As indicated above, this portion of the decree does not interfere in any respect with any mining concession existing at the time of the decree, and in fact reinforces those privately held rights as inviolable.

References

External links
Website Minera San Christobal
Protests Mount Against San Cristobal Silver Mine - video report by Democracy Now!

Silver mines in Bolivia
Zinc mines
Lead mines
Mines in Potosí Department